Loukik Jadhav (born 12 May 1989 in Pune, Maharashtra) is an Indian footballer who last played as a midfielder for Mumbai Tigers.

Career

Pailan Arrows
In the summer of 2011, Jadhav joined I-League club Pailan Arrows for the 2011–12 season. He played his first game against HAL in the I-League on 2 November 2011, Pailan drew the game 1–1.

Career statistics

Club
Statistics accurate as of 30 April 2012

References

Indian footballers
1989 births
Living people
I-League players
Association football midfielders
Indian Arrows players
Mahindra United FC players
Mumbai Tigers FC players
Footballers from Pune